The women's long jump event  at the 2001 IAAF World Indoor Championships was held on March 10.

Results

References
Results

Long
Long jump at the World Athletics Indoor Championships
2001 in women's athletics